The flag of Birmingham is the flag of the city of Birmingham in England. A flag for the city that is freely flyable by the community was adopted following a public competition in 2015.  It is distinct from the flag flown exclusively by Birmingham City Council which is a banner of arms derived from the city's coat of arms. A competition to design a new flag for public use was held during early 2015 with 470 proposed designs being entered into the competition.

The successful entry was announced on 23 July 2015 and was designed by 11 year old Thomas Keogh and David Smith.  It takes the form of a yellow bull's head, recalling Birmingham's Bull Ring, placed on a red field with an abstract yellow letter "B" on blue (the blue representing the cities expansive canal network) at the hoist which, when placed on its side, forms the Roman numeral "M" (1000) representing Birmingham's epithet "City of a Thousand Trades". The colour and design of the flag echo those of the coat of arms.

References

Birmingham
Birmingham 
Birmingham
Culture in Birmingham, West Midlands
History of Birmingham, West Midlands
Birmingham